Acta Morphologica Neerlando-Scandinavica is an anatomical journal that was published in Utrecht, Netherlands, by Oosthoek from 1956 to 1989. It consists of volumes 1–27, and is a continuation of the earlier journal Acta Neerlandica Morphologiae normalis et pathologicae, published by Oosthoek from 1938 to 1949.

Acta Morphologica Neerlando-Scandinavica was succeeded by the European Journal of Morphology, which was published in Lisse, Netherlands, from 1990 to 2005.

Anatomy journals
Publications established in 1938
Publications disestablished in 2005
English-language journals